"The Boy Is Mine" is a duet by American singers Brandy and Monica. It was written by LaShawn Daniels, Japhe Tejeda, Fred Jerkins III, Rodney "Darkchild" Jerkins, and Brandy, while production was helmed by Jerkins, Brandy, and Dallas Austin. It was released as the lead single from both singers' second albums from 1998, Never Say Never by Brandy and the title track by Monica. Inspired by Michael Jackson and Paul McCartney's 1982 duet "The Girl Is Mine", the lyrics of the mid-tempo R&B track revolve around two women fighting over a man.

The song received generally positive reviews from music critics and was the first number-one pop hit for both artists, in the US and internationally. Exploiting the media's presumption of a rivalry between the two young singers, "The Boy Is Mine" became the best-selling song of the year in the US, selling 2.6 million copies, and spent 13 weeks at the top of the US Billboard Hot 100. It became the second song in the history of the chart to ascend directly to number-one from a previous position beneath the Top 20, at number 23, following The Beatles and the 27–1 leap of their single "Can't Buy Me Love" in April 1964. Internationally, the single also achieved a strong charting, peaking at number one in Canada, the Netherlands and New Zealand, while reaching the top five on most of the other charts on which it appeared.

The accompanying music video, directed by Joseph Kahn, starred the singers and Mekhi Phifer. It was nominated for two MTV Video Music Awards, including Video of the Year and Best R&B Video. In addition, "The Boy Is Mine" was awarded the Grammy Award for Best R&B Vocal Performance by a Duo or Group and received nominations for both Record of the Year and Best R&B Song in 1999. Billboard named it the Hot 100 Sales Single of Year and also listed it 54th on its 50th Anniversary All-Time Hot 100 Top Songs chart, as well as 18th on the All-Time Top R&B/Hip-Hop Songs countdown. In 2012, the singers reunited on the single "It All Belongs to Me".

Background 
 
"The Boy Is Mine" was a song Brandy wrote with Rodney "Darkchild" Jerkins, his brother Fred Jerkins III, Japhe Tejeda, and LaShawn Daniels. The singer came up with its concept while watching an episode of The Jerry Springer Show tabloid talk show, where love triangles among the guests was the theme. Created as a solo track, Brandy originally recorded the song alone. After listening to the result, however, she and Jerkins thought it would work better as a duet, an idea which was further inspired by Paul McCartney and Michael Jackson's 1982 hit duet "The Girl Is Mine". At Brandy's request, her label Atlantic Records approached fellow R&B teen singer Monica to collaborate: The pair had seen each other in passing at award shows and other live events, and Brandy thought a duet would help combat ongoing rumors that the singers were rivals. With the permission of Clive Davis, who headed Monica's record company Arista Records, Monica eventually signed on to the project.

Originally, the two artists recorded their vocals for the song together with Jerkins and his production team at the Record One studios in Los Angeles. However, the joint recording was felt to be a failure so Monica re-recorded her vocals separately at the DARP Studios in Atlanta, Georgia with longtime contributor Dallas Austin and turned the song into a more mature pop sound. (Thus, Austin would later share the main production credit alongside Jerkins.) Though both Brandy and Monica repeatedly denied the song reflected any actual rivalry between them, tabloids began writing the opposite. There were claims that Monica was upset when Brandy performed the song solo on The Tonight Show with Jay Leno, and Brandy was reportedly miffed when Monica opted to take the name of the duet for the title of her second album. Following reports that the pair came to blows during a rehearsal for a performance at the MTV Video Music Awards in September 1998, talk of the rivalry became so loud that the singers' managers released a joint statement in which they called the press out for its "disturbing behavior" and called the "ongoing negativity [as] totally unfair." However, Jerkins later claimed that both singers "didn’t get along" during production and that he and Dexter Simmons remixed the track seven times to keep everything even. In a 2012 interview with WZMX, Monica spoke about her past relationship with Brandy:

"We were young. We could barely stay in the room with each other. By no means was it jealousy or envy. She and I are polar opposites and instead of embracing that, we used our differences as reasons not to be amongst each other."

Composition 

"The Boy Is Mine" was written by Brandy Norwood, LaShawn Daniels, Japhe Tejeda, Fred Jerkins III, and his brother Rodney "Darkchild" Jerkins. Musically, the song has been described as "R&B-pop." Written in thirty-two-bar form, "The Boy Is Mine" starts off with a twinkling yet stormy synthesized harp line, produced through the harp setting of a keyboard. When the two protagonists initiate a conversation that depicts their first meeting as rivals, the track adds a pulsing beat and a countermelody of cello strings before the chorus kicks in. Similar to McCartney and Jackson's "The Girl Is Mine", Jerkins and his team structured "The Boy Is Mine" with spaces. During the constructing of the lyrics, they settled on a call and response form, giving each singer two bars a piece to sing.

According to the sheet music published at Musicnotes.com by Sony/ATV Music Publishing, the song is set in the time signature of common time, with a tempo of 93 beats per minute. Written in the key of C minor, it follows a chord progression of Fm9–Cm9, and the vocals span from G3 to F4. The song's lyrics chronicle a catfight between two young women who try to convince each other that they are the object of a man's affection. On the track, each trades increasingly escalating remarks about how the other must be mistaken, jealous or delusional about her importance to the man in question. The chorus runs as follows: "You need to give it up, had about enough, it's not hard to see, the boy is mine." Critics noted that the lyrics almost take on the heated fell of a political debate or even a reality show."

Critical reception 
The song has garnered positive reviews from music critics. AllMusic editor Stephen Thomas Erlewine ranked the duet among the best songs on both album, Never Say Never (1998) and The Boy Is Mine (1998). Larry Flick from Billboard called it a "surprisingly subdued, ultimately sleek and soulful jam." He added, "Joined by fellow jeep ingénue Monica, TV's "Moesha" reveals a markedly matured style and a far more flexible range. Meanwhile, Monica whets appetites for her own forthcoming disc with a deliciously diva-driven performance that is rife with subtext." He complimented the producers for dressing the singers in "plush synths and quietly insinuating beats that will have seasoned listeners reminiscing about the heyday of Barry White and the Love Unlimited Orchestra. This isn't the obviously poppy or immediately infectious single one might have expected as the preview to Brandy's new disc, but after a second spin, you won't be able to shake the subtle hook from your brain." Entertainment Weeklys J.D. Considine felt that "there's none of the soul-baring theatrics we'd get if Faith Evans and Mary J. Blige had gone at it. Instead, the two younger women play second fiddle to the steady-thumping bass, keeping their voices so low you'd think they were afraid a teacher might overhear them."  In a different review, his colleague Matt Diehl wrote, "No, this isn't an estrogen flip on the Michael Jackson hit. Nor is it the soul-sista catfight that the pairing of these teen-dream divas-in-training promised (the too-silky production delivers a TKO to any gritty R&B tension). Still, child star Brandy sings like a woman for the first time, making her potential for an adult career à la Toni Braxton a distinct possibility." Lorraine Ali, writing for Rolling Stone, complimented Jerkins' production for its "sweeping orchestration." Craig Seymour from The Village Voice said that the song "creeps up on you with a harp sound that's like light twinkling on a reflective pool." He found that "You don't groove to it so much as you vibe in it, as Brandy and Monica kick a rather standard script [...] in their surprisingly complementary styles. Brandy is to groove what Monica is to rhythm. Where Brandy rides the contour of a melody like a wave, Monica advances and recedes, spontaneously creating then dismissing parallel rhythms."

Chart performance 
On June 5, 1998, "The Boy Is Mine" became both singers' first number-one hit and fifth top ten entry for each on the US Billboard Hot 100. Bouncing from number 93 to the number 1  spot, it became the second song in the history of the chart to ascend directly to number-one from a previous position beneath the Top 90, following The Beatles and the 27–1 leap of their single "Can't Buy Me Love" in April 1964. In addition, it was the first number-one collaboration between solo women since 1979's two-weeks number-one run of "No More Tears (Enough Is Enough)," performed by Barbra Streisand and Donna Summer. The same week, "The Boy Is Mine" also moved to number-one on the Hot R&B Singles, Hot 100 Singles Sales and Hot Dance Music/Maxi-Singles Sales charts. Within the first month of its purchasable release the song went on to sell 605,000 units. It spent thirteen consecutive weeks atop the Billboard Hot 100 and has since been ranked among the longest running number-one songs in US chart history, sharing this record with Boyz II Men's "End of the Road" (1992). "The Boy Is Mine" was the best-selling single of 1998 in the US, with sales of 4,500,000, with the second best-selling single being Next's "Too Close". It was certified double platinum by the Recording Industry Association of America (RIAA) and was ranked eighth on Billboards Decade-End Charts. The song spent 18 weeks in the top 10 and a total of 27 weeks in the Top 50.

Outside the US, "The Boy Is Mine" reached the top-ten in over 14 countries and topped the chart in Canada, the Netherlands and New Zealand.  In Canada, the song debuted on the RPM Singles Chart at number 74 on the RPM issue dated June 1, 1998, and reached the top spot of the chart on August 21, 1998. It was present on the chart for a total of 45 weeks. It reached the top two in Belgium, France (platinum), Ireland, Norway (gold), and the United Kingdom (platinum); the top-five in Australia, Germany (gold), Sweden, and Switzerland (gold) and the top-ten in Austria (gold) and Italy.

Awards and recognitions 
The single won many awards throughout 1998 and 1999. It was nominated for three Grammy Awards at the 41st annual ceremony, winning both singers their first prize by the National Academy of Recording Arts and Sciences in the Best R&B Performance by a Duo or Group with Vocals category. It, however, lost in its nominations for Record of the Year and Best R&B Song to Celine Dion's "My Heart Will Go On" and Lauryn Hill's "Doo Wop (That Thing)" respectively. The song garnered three Billboard Music Awards.

It was listed as number 55 of the Hot 100 singles of all time by Billboard in 1998. This position was raised to number 54 in 2008. In addition, it was listed 18th on the All-Time Top R&B/Hip-Hop Songs countdown. In 2008, Billboard ranked the song third on a special The 40 Biggest Duets of All Time listing. The song is the best-selling song of 1998 in the United States with 4.5 million copies sold.

Music video 
A music video for "The Boy Is Mine" was directed by Joseph Kahn. Filmed in Los Angeles in April 1998, it uses 90-degree tilts to depict the drama and the playfulness between the two. 
Making its debut on April 22, 1998, it uses the radio edit of the song, removing the intro. It was nominated for two MTV Video Music Awards at the 1998 ceremony, including Best R&B Video and Video of the Year, but lost to both Wyclef Jean's "Gone Till November" and Madonna's "Ray of Light" respectively.

Synopsis 

The video begins with Brandy watching an episode of The Jerry Springer Show. Next we see Monica who, using her remote, accidentally turns Brandy's TV along with her own to watch an old romantic movie. Confused, Brandy changes her channel back. Much to their dismay, whenever one of them turns the channel, the other's TV is also turned. They begin singing. The next scene shows the two discussing their problem among their separate groups of friends. The titular boy himself (played by Mekhi Phifer) then appears outside adjacent apartments, 6 & 7, where we later discover the two girls live; all their friends walk by him as they exit their respective friend's place. The girls are seen next arguing through their adjoining bedroom wall, until the boy phones them one after the other. They each overhear the other's conversation through the wall, realizing that they've both been played. They proceed to gather up all gifts and memorabilia related to the boy and toss them out the door. After Brandy and Monica sing more through the song's lyrics, the boy knocks on Brandy's door. The door opens showing Brandy for a brief moment before she opens the door wider to reveal Monica beside her. Noticing that he had been caught, the boy is taken aback, and the door is slammed in his face before he even gets a chance to talk to them, ending the video.

Live performances 
Brandy first performed the song by herself on The Tonight Show. Following that, she and Monica first performed it together at the 1998 MTV Video Music Awards in Los Angeles at the Gibson Amphitheatre on September 10, 1998, an event which remains, to date, Brandy and Monica's only television broadcast performance of the song. The pair came together a second time on December 16, 2008, for a surprise performance at Atlanta's V103 Soul Session, singing it a cappella.

In 2012, they performed the song with their new duet "It All Belongs To Me" at V-103's "Conversation/Soul Session".

Accolades

Track listings 

US 12-inch single
A1. "The Boy Is Mine" (extended mix) – 7:40
A2. "The Boy Is Mine" (a cappella) – 4:30
B1. "The Boy Is Mine" (album version) – 4:52
B2. "The Boy Is Mine" (album instrumental) – 4:52

US and Canadian maxi-CD single
 "The Boy Is Mine" (album version)
 "The Boy Is Mine" (club mix)
 "The Boy Is Mine" (radio with intro)
 "The Boy Is Mine" (album instrumental)
 "The Boy Is Mine" (a cappella)

US CD, 7-inch, and cassette single
 "The Boy Is Mine" (radio edit with intro) – 4:00
 "The Boy Is Mine" (instrumental) – 4:52

UK CD and 12-inch single, Australian CD single
 "The Boy Is Mine" (radio edit without intro) – 4:00
 "The Boy Is Mine" (radio edit with intro) – 4:00
 "The Boy Is Mine" (LP version) – 4:51
 "The Boy Is Mine" (club version) – 7:40

UK cassette single and European CD single
 "The Boy Is Mine" (radio edit without intro) – 4:00
 "The Boy Is Mine" (club version) – 7:40

Credits and personnel 
Credits are taken from the Never Say Never liner notes.

 Brandy Norwood – music production, songwriting, lead vocals, background vocals
 Monica Arnold – lead vocals, background vocals
 Dallas Austin – Monica's vocal production
 Leslie Brathwaite – recording engineer
 LaShawn Daniels – Brandy's vocal production, vocal arrangements, songwriting
 The Darkchild Orchestra – strings
 Ben Garrison – music recording
 Larry Gold – string arrangements

 Rodney Jerkins – music production, Brandy's vocal production, vocal arrangements, string arrangements, songwriting, mixing
 Carlton Lynn – engineering assistant
 Victor McCoy – engineering assistant
 Isaac Phillips – guitar
 Dexter Simmons – music recording, audio mixing
 Chris Tergesen – string section recording engineer 
 Greg Thompson – engineering assistant

Charts

Weekly charts

Year-end charts

Decade-end charts

All-time charts

Certifications and sales

Release history

Cover versions and remixes

In 1998, UK garage group Architechs remixed "The Boy Is Mine", and released it as a white label bootleg which eventually sold 20,000 copies. This remix became highly popular due to incessant airplay on pirate radio.
In 2001, Brandy and Monica's vocals were merged with Modjo's 2000 dance hit single "Lady (Hear Me Tonight)" by British DJs Stuntmasterz. Starting as an underground hit, "The Ladyboy Is Mine" was later commercially released to become a moderate hit across Europe, reaching the top ten in the United Kingdom, Belgium and the top forty in France and Switzerland. The commercial release didn't include the vocal sample from Modjo's "Lady" as Warner Brothers label East West were unable to clear it. Instead the release used the same sample from Chic's "Soup for One" and created an alternate version that only featured Brandy and Monica.
In 2009, Japanese singer BENI and American singer Tynisha Keli covered this song.
The song was covered in 2010 by Amber Riley and Naya Rivera for the TV show Glee as their respective characters. Their version hit number 76 on the Billboard Hot 100.
In 2018, Postmodern Jukebox released a 1940s vintage cover of the song, starring the sisters Emily and Juliette Goglia. The YouTube video has received 1.6 million views as of December 21, 2020.
On the October 14, 2019, episode of reality television singing competition show The Voice, Team (John) Legend members Khalea Lynee of St. Petersburg, Florida, and Zoe Upkins of Nashville, Tennessee, performed the song in a Battle round. Coaches Kelly Clarkson, Gwen Stefani, and Blake Shelton were all divided, with Stefani preferring Upkins's performance, Shelton preferring Lynee's performance, and Clarkson abstaining from naming her preference. Legend chose to agree with Shelton and named Lynee the winner of the Battle, advancing her to the Knockout rounds. Soon after, Legend also attempted to save Upkins and keep her on his team, as well, although Clarkson and Stefani both attempted to steal her instead, with the three coaches' attempts saving her from elimination regardless of her choice. Ultimately, Upkins opted to remain on Team Legend, advancing to the Knockouts on his team.

Charts (Glee Cast version)

See also 
List of Billboard Hot 100 chart achievements and milestones
List of Hot 100 number-one singles of 1998 (U.S.)

References

External links 
 "The Boy Is Mine" music video on MTV.com

1998 songs
1998 singles
Answer songs
Atlantic Records singles
Billboard Hot 100 number-one singles
Brandy Norwood songs
Dutch Top 40 number-one singles
Monica (singer) songs
Music videos directed by Joseph Kahn
Number-one singles in New Zealand
RPM Top Singles number-one singles
Song recordings produced by Dallas Austin
Song recordings produced by Rodney Jerkins
Songs about infidelity
Songs written by Brandy Norwood
Songs written by Fred Jerkins III
Songs written by LaShawn Daniels
Songs written by Rodney Jerkins
Female vocal duets